Kirat Chuli or Tent Peak is a mountain in the Himalayas. It lies on the border between Nepal and India.

Location 

Climbing history 
The first ascent to the summit was made by Ernst Grob, Herbert Paidar, and Ludwig Schmaderer in 1939.

See also
 Kirata
 Kirata Kingdom
 Kirati people
 Kirat Mundhum

References

Mountains of Sikkim
India–Nepal border
International mountains of Asia
Seven-thousanders of the Himalayas
Mountains of Koshi Province
Sacred mountains of Nepal